Ilona Mądra (born 3 December 1966) is a Polish former basketball player who competed in the 2000 Summer Olympics.

References

1966 births
Living people
Polish women's basketball players
Olympic basketball players of Poland
Basketball players at the 2000 Summer Olympics
Sportspeople from Kraków